Fassouta is a local council on the northwestern slopes of Mount Meron in the Northern District of Israel, south of the Lebanese border.

History
There have been several archaeological excavation at Fassuta, which reveal settlement from the Early Bronze Age, through the Iron Age, Hellenistic and the Mamluk eras.

From approximately 70 CE to 450 CE, Fassuta was the site of a Jewish settlement known as Mafsheta. It was home to a synagogue. 

In the Crusader era Fassuta was known as Fassove. In 1183 it was noted that Godfrey de Tor sold the land of the village to Joscelin III. In 1220 Jocelyn III's daughter Beatrix de Courtenay and her husband Otto von Botenlauben, Count of Henneberg, sold their land, including Fassove, to the Teutonic Knights.

Ottoman Empire
Fassuta was incorporated into the Ottoman Empire in 1517, and in the 1596 tax records it was part of the Nahiya of Akka of the Safad Sanjak. It had a population of 12 Muslim households and 3 Muslim bachelors. The villagers paid a fixed tax-rate of 20% on wheat, barley, fruit trees, and goats or beehives; a total of 1,988 akçe.

In 1838 Fesutha was noted as a Christian and Druze village in the El-Jebel district, west of Safad.

In 1875, Guerin found Fassuta inhabited by some "twenty united Greek families". He also noted that Fassute had succeeded an ancient village, of which there were many remains.

In 1881, the PEF's "Survey of Western Palestine" (SWP) described Fassuta as "a village, built of stone, containing about 200 Christians, situated on ridge, with gardens of figs, olives, and arable land. There are two cisterns in the village, and a good spring near."

A population list from about 1887 showed Fassutah to have about 570 inhabitants.

British Mandate

At the time of the 1922 census of Palestine conducted by the British Mandate, Fassuta had a population of 459, 444 Christians and 15 Muslims, where the Christians were 1 Orthodox, 18 Syrian orthodox, and 425 Melkites. In the 1931 census, the combined population of Fassuta and Mansura was 507 Palestinian Christians and 81 Muslims, living in a total of 129 houses.

In the 1945 statistics Fassuta had 1,050 inhabitants. The combined population of Fassuta, Al-Mansura and Dayr al-Qasi was 2,300, and their total land area was 34,011 dunums. 1,607 dunams were plantations and irrigable land, 6,475 used for cereals, while 247 dunams were built-up (urban) land.
Between 1922 and 1947, the population of Fassuta increased by 120%.

Israel
At the end of October 1948 the village was captured by the Israeli army during Operation Hiram. Most of the Muslim population fled or were expelled but many of the Christians remained. In December 1949 the IDF put forward a plan to expel the remaining population of Fassuta and five other villages in order to create a 5–10 km Arab-free zone along the Lebanon border. This plan was blocked by the Foreign Ministry which feared international reaction. The Arab population remained under Martial Law until 1966.

Demographics

In 2005, the population of Fassuta was 2,900 residents, with an annual population growth rate of 0.9%. All of the inhabitants are Christians of the Melkite (Greek) Catholic Church. In 2000, 60.5% of Fassuta high school students passed the Bagrut matriculation exam.  In 2000, the mean income was NIS 3,748, compared to a national average of NIS 6,835.

Religion and culture
In 2007, the Mar Elias Church in Fassuta celebrated its 100th anniversary. The church is named after Elias, the village's patron saint. A large statue of Mar Elias stands in the central square.

Archaeology
In 1875, Guerin found traces of ancient ruins: "Numerous cisterns, a great reservoir, vestiges of many ruined houses, fine cut stones marking out floors, and a dozen of presses nearly perfect. These presses are all on the same model : worked in the rock, they consisted of two compartments, one larger, in which the grapes were placed,
and one smaller and lower down, in which the juice was received. In the humble church of the modern hamlet I remarked a chapter imitating  Corinthian, and probably of Byzantine period. On two of its faces a cross with equal branches has been sculptured. Above the door of the main church has been placed for a lintel a fragment of frieze decorated with
flowers and foliage elegantly executed."

Notable people

 Sabri Jiryis
 Anton Shammas

See also
 Arab localities in Israel
 Christianity in Israel

References

Bibliography

  
 
 
  
  
  (p. 633 )

External links
 Welcome To Fassuta
 Survey of Western Palestine, Map 4: IAA, Wikimedia commons

Arab localities in Israel
Arab Christian communities in Israel
Local councils in Northern District (Israel)